is a Japanese voice actor, tarento, and actor from Tokyo. He is best known for voicing as the villain character, Yoichi Takato from Kindaichi Case Files series.

Filmography

Anime television series
Zillion (1987) (Dr. Kariga)
Topo Gigio (1988) (Pierre)
Shurato (1989) (Antena)
Idol Angel Yokoso Yoko (1990) (Zen)
Future GPX Cyber Formula (1991) (Asurada)
Tonde Burin (1994) (Shinichiro Kokubu)
Saint Tail (1995) (Kawai)
Mama Loves the Poyopoyo-Saurus (1995) (Gendai's Father)
Martian Successor Nadesico (1996) (Prospector)
B'TX (1996) (B'T Falcon)
Inuyasha (2000) (Newscaster)
Hikaru no Go (2001) (Kawaii-san)
Eureka Seven (2005) (Morita)
RockMan.EXE (2005) (Dark Miyabi)
Keroro Gunsō (2008) (Alien Kanryō)
Yashahime: Princess Half-Demon (2021) (Nanahoshi)

Unknown date
Kaiketsu Zorori (Yocchan)
Kindaichi Case Files (Takato Youichi, Watson)
Kinnikuman: Nisei (Ramenman)
Cinderella Boy (Romer)
Beyblade (George Smith)
Attacker You! (Machio Tsuruoka)
Hajime no Ippo (Fujii)
Futari wa Pretty Cure (Evil King, Shiklp)
Futari wa Pretty Cure Max Heart (Baldez)
Bobobo-bo Bo-bobo (Nenchaku)
Super Robot Wars Original Generation: Divine Wars (Sanger Zonvolt)
Machine Robo: Revenge of Cronos (Gillhead, Devil Satan 6)
Machine Robo: Battle Hackers (Shuttle Robo, Shibumidas, Devil Satan 6)
Muka Muka Paradise (Bundoi)
Romeo's Blue Skies (Leon)
Love Hina (Naru's stepfather)
Flame of Recca (Fumio Tatesako (Tatesako-sensei))
One Piece (Gin, Dalton, Mr. 11, San Juan Wolf)
Powerpuff Girls Z (Radio Wave Monster)
Dai-Guard (Shirou Shirota)
Kaito Joker (Dark Eye)

OVA
Cosmo Police Justy (1985) (Bolbar)
 Guyver (1989) (Aptom)
 Future GPX Cyber Formula (1991) (Asurada)
 Legend of the Galactic Heroes (1991) (Sound Soulszzcuaritter)
 Mōryō Senki Madara (1991) (Koubaku)
 Mega Man: Upon a Star (1993) (Yuta's Father)
 The Rapeman (1994) (Tatsuo)
 Special Duty Combat Unit Shinesman (1996) (Shinesman Sepia)
 Gekigangar III (1998) (Umitsubame Joe)
 Super Robot Wars Original Generation: The Animation (2005) (Sanger Zonvolt)
 Stratos 4 (2006) (Jun Mikuriya)

Anime films
 Noiseman Sound Insect (1997) (Prospector)
 Martian Successor Nadesico: The Prince of Darkness (1998) (Prospector)
 Kindaichi Case Files 2 (xxxx) (Takato Youichi)
 Trigun: Badlands Rumble (2010)

Games
 Super Adventure Rockman (1998) (Gutsman, Flashman)
 Zettai Zetsumei Toshi (2002) (Takashi Tsuzugi, Yoshitaka Shinzaki)
 From TV Animation - One Piece: Grand Battle! 2 (2002) (Dalton)
 Project X Zone (2012) (Sanger Zonvolt)
 Kinnikuman Series (xxxx-xx) (Ramenman/Mongolman, Specialman)
 Super Robot Wars Series (xxxx-xx) (Sanger Zonvolt, Prospector, Devil Satan 6, Wodan Ymir)
 Super Robot Wars MX (2004) (Devil Satan 6)
 Super Robot Wars Z (2008)
 Puyo Puyo (Dark Prince)
 Puyo Puyo 7 (2009) (Risukuma-senpai)
 Puyo Puyo!! 20th Anniversary (xxxx) (Risukuma-senpai)
 Puyo Puyo Tetris (xxxx) (Risukuma-senpai)

Drama CDs
 Analyst no Yuutsu series 1: Benchmark ni Koi wo Shite (xxxx) (Shinjirou Tsujitani)
 Fushigi Yūgi Genbu Kaiden (xxxx) (Soruen)
 Last Order (xxxx) (Kazuhiro Shiho)
 Pearl series 2: Yokubari na Pearl (xxxx) (Shuuichi Kawamura)
 Pearl series 3: Wagamama na Pearl (xxxx) (Shuuichi Kawamura)
 Pearl series 4: Kimagure na Pearl (xxxx) (Shuuichi Kawamura)
 Shinshitsu No Kagi Kaimasu (xxxx) (Pastor)
 Tokyo Deep Night (xxxx) (Kitou)
 Yumemiru Nemuri Otoko (xxxx) (Okagami)

Dub work

Live-action
 1987: When the Day Comes (Han Byung-yong (Yoo Hae-jin))
 All of Us Are Dead (Nam So-ju (Jeon Bae-soo))
 Apollo 13 (Henry Hurt (Xander Berkeley))
 Coherence (Mike (Nicholas Brendon))
 Confidential Assignment (Kang Jin-tae (Yoo Hae-jin))
 Die Hard with a Vengeance (1999 TV Asahi edition) (Rolf (Robert Sedgwick))
 Deep Rising (Mulligan)
 Dawn of the Dead (Steve (Ty Burrell))
 The Fast and the Furious (Muse)
 The Goonies (Troy Perkins (Steve Antin))
 L.A. Law (Jonathan Rollins)
 Last Light (2009 DVD edition) (Lt. Lionel McMannis (Clancy Brown))
 Mad About You (Paul Buchman (Paul Reiser))
 On the Edge (Mikey (Paul Hickey))
 Scrooged (James Cross (John Murray))

Animation
Dorothy and the Wizard of Oz (Cowardly Lion)

References

External links
Rush Style profile
Remax profile
Kenichi Ono's blog

Japanese male video game actors
Japanese male voice actors
1958 births
Male voice actors from Tokyo
Living people
20th-century Japanese male actors
21st-century Japanese male actors